Shahrakht (also Romanized as Shāhrakht) is a village in Petergan Rural District, Central District, Zirkuh County, South Khorasan Province, Iran. At the 2006 census, its population was 2,427, in 515 families.

References 

Populated places in Zirkuh County